The Civic Tower, also called Civic Center Towers, Civic Towers, is a 16 floor office building in Lagos (other sources say 15 floors). It is located a short distance from the Civic Centre on Ozumba Mbadiwe Avenue, Victoria Island, Lagos. It was officially opened in 2015 and it is owned by Business Tycoon Uzor Christopher.

On 20, July 2018, the Civic Towers and Civic Centre buildings were lit up in red to mark the 50th anniversary of Special Olympics alongside 225 iconic landmarks across the world.

Reference 

Buildings and structures in Lagos
2015 establishments in Nigeria
Skyscraper office buildings in Lagos
Landmarks in Lagos